"One Love" is a song co-written and recorded by American country music artist Carlene Carter.  It was released in August 1991 as the fourth single from the album I Fell in Love.  The song reached number 33 on the Billboard Hot Country Singles & Tracks chart.  It was written by Carter, Howie Epstein and Perry Lamek.

Chart performance

References

1991 singles
1990 songs
Carlene Carter songs
Songs written by Carlene Carter
Songs written by Howie Epstein
Song recordings produced by Howie Epstein
Reprise Records singles